Holtsville was a station stop on the Greenport Branch of the Long Island Rail Road. It was located off the southeast corner of the Waverly Avenue grade crossing on the south side of the tracks between Long Island Avenue and Furrows Road in Holtsville, New York.

History
The station first opened in a local store as Waverly around 1843.  Although the surrounding area was renamed Holtsville in 1860 when a post office opened, the station retained the name "Waverly" until the 1890s, when farmers complained about their shipments going to an upstate town named Waverly by mistake. Holtsville Station was rebuilt on May 13, 1912, only to be burned in another fire on January 4, 1914, and replaced again later the same year. South of the station was the northern terminus of the Suffolk Traction Company's main trolley line, which was proposed to be extended to Port Jefferson, New York, across a bridge over the tracks before the company went bankrupt in 1919. The station building was bulldozed in June 1962, but the station itself continued to operate until March 16, 1998, when it was closed due to low ridership.

References

External links
Picture of Holtsville May 13, 1912 (Ron Ziel collection)
1960 image of Holtsville Station (In Color)
Holtsville Station History (TrainsAreFun.com)

Railway stations in the United States opened in 1843
Railway stations closed in 1998
Former Long Island Rail Road stations in Suffolk County, New York
1843 establishments in New York (state)